Gurmukh Singh (born 1 January 1999), is an Indian professional footballer who plays as a defender for Indian Super League club Chennaiyin.

Career statistics

Club

References

Living people
1999 births
Indian footballers
Association football defenders
Rajasthan United FC players